The 2014–15 Celta de Vigo season was the club's 91st season in its history and its 49th in the top-tier.

Squad

Current squad

Out on loan

Transfers
 

In:

 
 
 
 
 

Out:

Competitions

Overall

La Liga

League table

Results summary

Results by round

Matches
Kickoff times are in CET.

Copa del Rey

Round of 32

Round of 16

Statistics

Appearances and goals

|-
! colspan=10 style=background:#dcdcdc; text-align:center|Goalkeepers

|-
! colspan=10 style=background:#dcdcdc; text-align:center|Defenders

|-
! colspan=10 style=background:#dcdcdc; text-align:center|Midfielders

|-
! colspan=10 style=background:#dcdcdc; text-align:center|Forwards

References

RC Celta de Vigo seasons
Celta de Vigo